Wee Papa Girl Rappers were a British female rap duo, that found chart success in the late 1980s. They were twin sisters Sandra and Samantha Lawrence.

Overview 
Before being signed to Jive Records, the two sisters were backing singers for Feargal Sharkey. Sandra Lawrence (aka Total S) and Samantha Lawrence (aka TY Tim) are best remembered for the single "Wee Rule" – more inspired by reggae and dancehall than rap/hip hop – which reached number 6 on the UK Singles Chart in October 1988. Another of their singles, "Heat it Up" featuring 2 Men and a Drum Machine, reached number 21 on the UK Singles Chart in June 1988. It also featured an acid house/techno style remix from Inner City's Kevin Saunderson. They released two albums on Jive Records before first splitting up in early 1991. A later reincarnation as The Wee Papas saw limited returns.

The duo got their name "Wee Papa" from the Saint Lucia French Creole expression "Oui Papa", which their father frequently uttered. Their father hailed from the Caribbean island of Saint Lucia.

Wee Papa Girl Rappers also worked with Greek singer, Michalis Rakintzis.

Discography

Studio albums

Singles

References

External links
Discog's Wee Papa Girl Rappers page

English hip hop groups
Women hip hop groups
English girl groups
Black British musical groups
British hip hop girl groups
Jive Records artists
Rappers from London
English women rappers
Black British women rappers
Hip hop duos
English musical duos
Sibling musical duos
Twin musical duos
Female musical duos